Montell Julian Griffin (born June 6, 1970) is an American former professional boxer. He held the WBC light heavyweight title in 1997 and challenged twice for a world title.

Early life
Montell Griffin was born June 6, 1970, in Chicago. By age 22, Griffin was living in Midway City, California and defeated Frank Vassar of Spokane, Washington in the 1992 U.S. Amateur Boxing Championships.  He defeated future heavyweight contender Jeremy Williams at the box-offs, to make the 1992 Olympic team.

Amateur career
Griffin compiled an amateur record of 36-5. He won the 1992 United States Amateur Light Heavyweight title.

At the 1992 Olympic Trials in Worcester, Massachusetts, Griffin was outpointed in the final by Jeremy Williams. However, at the Olympic Box-offs he outpointed Williams twice, to earn an Olympic bid at light-heavyweight. His Olympic results were:
France Mabiletsa (Botswana) won on points
Yo-Da Ko (South Korea) won on points
Torsten May (Germany) lost through controversial scoring of points whereby some of his points were credited to May

Professional career
Griffin, nicknamed "Ice," began his pro career in 1993.  He rose to prominence when he defeated James Toney twice by controversial decisions in 1995 and 1996. The second victory over Toney earned Griffin a lucrative bout against WBC champion Roy Jones Jr.

Griffin vs. Jones Jr.
After his 1996 win over Toney, Griffin landed a shot at WBC light-heavyweight title holder Roy Jones Jr.  Griffin handed Jones his first professional defeat via a disqualification. A frustrated Jones dropped Griffin with a series of hard and fast, head and body punches in round nine, and then hit him again twice on the head after Griffin had taken a knee on the canvas, leading to Jones's disqualification.  They had an immediate rematch, and on August 21, Jones regained the WBC title by knocking out Griffin in the first round.

After the loss to Jones, Griffin remained a top-ranked light-heavyweight for six years. He won 11 of his next 12 bouts, losing only a controversial split decision to undefeated but unknown southpaw Eric Harding, despite knocking him down and out-landing him according to punchstats.

Griffin vs. Michalczewski
Four consecutive knockout wins later, the now 38-2 Griffin squared off against 40-0 Lineal/WBO champion, Dariusz Michalczewski in Germany. The 29-year-old Griffin won the first three rounds on the cards but was cut by the 31-year-old Michalczewski's jab in the second round. In the fourth, Griffin was twice staggered, and took 14 unanswered shots to the head and gloves, which forced referee Joe Cortez to stop the bout.

Griffin vs. Tarver
After defeating Derrick Harmon and George Khalid Jones by unanimous decisions, Griffin earned a shot at the vacant WBC/IBF titles against Antonio Tarver in 2003, losing a wide decision.

Now in his mid-thirties, a faded Griffin would go on to lose to Rico Hoye by split decision, Julio César González when the bout was stopped in the early goings on a technicality and sent to the scorecards, and Glen Johnson by TKO 11; all three were IBF eliminators. He also lost on points to Beibut Shumenov

Griffin compiled a very respectable resume over the course of his career: he has two wins over James Toney, a disqualification wins over Roy Jones Jr., and wins over contenders Ka-Dy King, Ray Lathon, Randall Yonker, Derrick Harmon and George Khalid Jones.

Professional boxing record

References

External links

1970 births
Boxers from Chicago
Boxers at the 1992 Summer Olympics
Olympic boxers of the United States
Winners of the United States Championship for amateur boxers
Living people
American male boxers
African-American boxers
World Boxing Council champions
People from Midway City, California
World light-heavyweight boxing champions
21st-century African-American sportspeople
20th-century African-American sportspeople